Menesthella is a genus of very small sea snails, pyramidellid gastropod mollusks, or micromollusks. This genus is currently placed in the subfamily Chrysallidinae of the family Odostomiidae. It was originally described as a subgenus of Menestho Möller, 1842 but was erected to genus status by Schander et al. 1999.

Shell description
The shell is small, broadly conical and imperforate. The surface is marked by strong, equally spaced spiral chords and by fine axial growth-lines seen between the sutures. The periphery of the last whorl is sulcate and the base is smooth. The columella fold (tooth) is strong.

Life habits
Little is known about the biology of the members of this genus. As is true of most members of the Pyramidellidae sensu lato, they are most likely to be ectoparasites.

Species
Species within the genus Menesthella include:
 Menesthella tarukiensis (Nomura, 1939) (Type species) (as Menestho tarukiensis)
 ...

References
 

Pyramidellidae

de:Pyramidelloidea